Mandadi Prabhakar Reddy (1935–1997) was an Indian film character actor and doctor known for his works in Telugu cinema. He acted in over 472 films over three decades. He wrote stories for several acclaimed films, including Karthika Deepam. The "Dr. M Prabhakara Reddy Chalana Chitra Karmika Chitrapuri" in Manikonda, Hyderabad is named in honor of him. He won four Nandi Awards.

Early life
He was born in Thungathurthy, Hyderabad State, (present day Suryapet district of Telangana) India to Lakshma Reddy and Kausalya.

After primary education in Suryapet town, he did his intermediate course from City College, Hyderabad. He did his medical education from Osmania Medical College under Osmania University, Hyderabad between 1955 and 1960.

Film career
Prabhakar Reddy debuted in the film Chivaraku Migiledi, directed by Gutta Ramineedu, in 1960, in which he acted as a psychiatrist. He acted in about 472 films during the next three decades.

He wrote stories for about 21 Telugu films. Some of them were highly successful. They include Pandanti Kapuram, Pacchani Samsaram, Dharmatmudu, Gruhapravesam, Gandhi Puttina Desam, Karthika Deepam and Naaku Swatantram Vacchindi. He wrote and directed the film Comrade (1996), which featured lyrics by K. G. Satyamurthy and Masterji.

He gave the screen name for famous Telugu actress Jaya Prada, originally Lalitha Rani, and introduced her in a three-minute song in the Telugu film Bhoomi Kosam in 1976.

Death
He died in 1997 in Hyderabad.due to  cariadic arrest.telugu film fraternity attended his funeral

Awards
Nandi Awards
 Best Actor - Yuvatharam Kadilindi (1980)
 Best Actor - Palle Pilichindi (1981)
 Second Best Story Writer - Grihapravesam (1982)
 Best Supporting Actor - Chinna Kodalu (1990)

Filmography

References

External links
 

1935 births
1997 deaths
Indian male film actors
Telugu male actors
People from Nalgonda
20th-century Indian male actors
Nandi Award winners
Osmania University alumni
Male actors from Andhra Pradesh
Male actors in Telugu cinema